Gnathophis bathytopos, the blackgut conger, is an eel in the family Congridae (conger/garden eels). It was described by David G. Smith and Robert H. Kanazawa in 1977. It is a marine, deep water-dwelling eel which is known from the Straits of Florida, USA, and the southeastern Gulf of Mexico, in the western Atlantic Ocean. It dwells at a depth range of 180–370 meters.

References

bathytopos
Taxa named by David G. Smith
Taxa named by Robert H. Kanazawa
Fish described in 1977